Herpetopoma instrictum, common name the basket-like false top shell, is a species of sea snail, a marine gastropod mollusk in the family Chilodontidae.

Description
The size of the shell varies between 3 mm and 10 mm. The small, solid, elevated shell has an ovate-conic shape. It is white, with a series of about 10 rufous spots near the suture. The five whorls form a conical spire. They are ventricose, with delicate, highly elevated spiral rib-striae,- of which there are about 5 on the upper and 10 on the last whorl. The surface of the ribs is slightly tuberculous, and the last one overhangs the succeeding whorl so as to form a broad deep channel at the suture. The interspaces have about the same width as the ribs, and are beautifully barred with close-set laminae. The base of the shell isconvex, with a small deep scalariform  umbilicus, sculptured like the spire. The aperture is obliquely semicircular. The outer lip is crenulated by the ribs, and conspicuously sulcate within. The columella is sharp, oblique, armed with a fully developed sharp tooth at the base, succeeded by a deep basal notch.

Distribution
This marine species occurs off Japan, the Philippines, New Caledonia and Fiji

References

External links
 To Encyclopedia of Life
 To World Register of Marine Species
 

instrictum
Gastropods described in 1849